Germacrenes are a class of volatile organic hydrocarbons, specifically, sesquiterpenes. Germacrenes are typically produced in a number of plant species for their antimicrobial and insecticidal properties, though they also play a role as insect pheromones. Two prominent molecules are germacrene A and germacrene D.

Structures 
Germacrene has five isomers.

Natural occurrences 
The essential oils of red deadnettle (Lamium purpureum) and hedgenettles (genus Stachys) are characterized by their high contents of germacrene D, as is Clausena anisata.  It is also a major component of patchouli oil.

References

Further reading

General

Germacrene A

Germacrene D 

 
 
 
 
 
 
 

Alkene derivatives
Sesquiterpenes
Cycloalkenes
B